Corinne Orr (born January 6, 1936) is a Canadian actress. She is best known for her work on the English version of the anime series Speed Racer.

Biography
Orr became involved in children's theatre beginning at the age of 10 (with her first role being in Alice in Wonderland) after she began taking elocution lessons due to her French accent, and started to develop her repertoire of voices. By the age of 14, she was working at the Canadian Broadcasting Corporation (CBC), as well as acting in stage theaters at the Mountain Playhouse in Montreal and the Crest Theatre in Toronto, working for the Montreal Shakespearian Company and alongside such notables as William Shatner. With her solid background on the stage, Orr was hired by CBC Radio for roles in their radio dramas such as Laura Limited. She then moved to CBC Television to portray the character of Suzie the Mouse in the children's soap opera Chez Helene, a bilingual program devoted to teaching children English and French.

Following her move to New York City, Orr began working regularly on radio and television, and as a voice artist, having been credited over 200 voice-over roles. One of her first jobs was a continuing role in the daytime soap opera The Nurses; others included voice acting roles in several CBS Radio Adventure Theater and CBS Radio Mystery Theater programs. She also began her lucrative career as spokesperson for a variety of companies in a wide range of radio and television commercials. In addition to commercials, Orr has narrated children's stories, provided voices for several dolls, and recorded numerous audiobooks. She was the voice of the Snuggle bear for 15 years and narrated Aliki Brandenberg's Mummies Made in Egypt for the PBS series Reading Rainbow, and participated in a special redubbing of an episode of Late Night with David Letterman. Orr's work as a voice actress included dubbing foreign films (including anime films) and series into English. Her television credits include the English versions of several 1960s-1990s Japanese series such as Marine Boy, where she voiced both male and female leads. She has also worked on American cartoon series such as The Adventures of the Galaxy Rangers and Princess Gwenevere and the Jewel Riders, as well as direct-to-video animated films.

She remains best known for her work on the English dubbed version of the 1960s anime Speed Racer, where she portrayed Speed's girlfriend Trixie and all of the female characters, as well as the voice of Speed's kid brother Spritle, who had a raspy voice, and which became a hit and a cult title in the United States. Following the release of the compilation film Speed Racer: The Movie, together with a fellow voice actor on the show, Peter Fernandez, she went on Children's Safety Network-sponsored tours around the country with the Mach 5 car in order to promote their campaign for children's safety. Her voice can be also heard in the 2008 Speed Racer live-action film. After the death of Fernandez in 2010, she became the last surviving English-language cast member of Speed Racer.

Orr judged the Daytime Emmy Awards for 18 years and served on the Screen Actors Guild council for 13 years. She has appeared as a guest of honor at numerous entertainment conventions (often with Fernandez, with whom she has worked together in most of her voice acting roles), including Friends of Old Time Radio, The Hollywood Show, Anime Weekend Atlanta, Zentrancon, Zenkaikon, Anime North, New York Anime Festival, and New York Comic Con. She was featured in Paley Archive's Women in Film series, Anthony Wynn's book Conversations at Warp Speed, and the documentary film Otaku Unite!. She also participated in many charity activities, such as a Pygmalion play where all the money went to a charity, volunteer work at New York hospital, teaching voiceover courses and reading to the homeless.

Filmography

Films
A Car's Life: Sparky's Big Adventure- Sparky, Norbert
Alakazam the Great - DeeDee (speaking)
Bug Bites: An Ant's Life- Rose, Gigi
Car's Life 2- Gracie, Sparky
Car's Life: The Royal Heist - Sparky, Gracie
Car's Life: Junkyard Blues - Sparky, Gracie
Enchanted Journey - Nono
For Those I Loved
Gammera the Invincible
Gamera vs. Jiger
Gnomes
Godzilla vs. the Sea Monster - Female voices
Grave of the Fireflies - Setsuko (credited as Rhoda Chrosite) (CPM dub)
Jack and the Beanstalk - Princess Margaret 
Jack and the Witch - Allegra
Kai Doh Maru - Oni-hime 
The Little Norse Prince
Noel
Otaku Unite! - Herself 
Peter Pan - Tiger Lily
Plan Bee - Bing
Popeye Meets the Man Who Hated Laughter - Swee'Pea / Olive Oyl / Blondie Bumstead / Cookie Bumstead / Lois Flagston / Dot Flagston / Ditto Flagston / Dale Arden / other voices
Speed Racer (2008) - Grand Prix female announcer
Spider's Web: A Pig's Tale - Walt, Ester, Cynthia, Lucy
Twelve Months - Anja
The Wild Swans - Elisa/Adult Elisa
The Wonderful World of Puss 'n Boots - Princess Rose

TV series
Ace Ventura: Pet Detective
The Adventures of the Galaxy Rangers - Queen of the Crown / Ingrid Arroyo / Kiwi Kids / additional voices
The Edge of Night - Mrs. Turner (1980)
The Flying House - Salome
Johnny Cypher in Dimension Zero - Zena / Rhom
Marine Boy - Marine Boy / Neptina / Clicli / all female characters
PB&J Otter - Wanda Raccoon / Shirley Duck / Georgina Snooty / Betty Lou Beaver
Princess Gwenevere and the Jewel Riders - Lady Kale (Queen Kale) / Queen Anya
Reading Rainbow - Herself
Samurai Jack
Sesame Street - various voices
Space Ghost Coast to Coast
Speed Racer - Trixie Fontaine / Spritle Racer / Mom Racer / additional voices
Stanley - Grandma Griff
Star Blazers - Queen Mariposa / Nova (third season)
Taco & Paco
Ultraman
Ultraman Tiga
The World of Hans Christian Andersen - Elisa / Kitty Kat / Little Boy / Match Girl

Home videos
Richard Scarry's Best Busy People Video Ever!Richard Scarry's Best Learning Songs Video Ever!''

References

External links 

1936 births
Living people
Actresses from Montreal
Anglophone Quebec people
American people of Polish-Jewish descent
American voice actresses
Canadian emigrants to the United States
Canadian film actresses
Canadian people of Polish-Jewish descent
Canadian radio actresses
Canadian stage actresses
Canadian television actresses
Canadian voice actresses
Jewish American actresses
Jewish Canadian actresses
21st-century American Jews
21st-century American women